Edward Alexander (Ted) White (born 18 April 1949) is a Canadian former politician who served in the House of Commons of Canada from 1993 to 2004.

Born in Southampton, England, White was first elected in the North Vancouver riding in 1993 as a Reform Party of Canada candidate in the 35th Canadian Parliament. He was re-elected in 1997 and 2000. While a member of parliament, the Reform party became known as the Canadian Alliance party, then merge into the Conservative Party of Canada. White was defeated in the 2004 federal election by Liberal candidate Don Bell.

In the 1983 British Columbia provincial election, he was a candidate for the separatist Western Canada Concept party in the North Vancouver-Seymour riding.

Achievements 
In June 1994 White was the first MP to use electronic voting to sample the opinions of constituents. He was criticized by opponents at the time because there was a charge to place the call to vote but White defended the charge as the only way to pay for the services being provided by Maritime Tel.

White was the Official Opposition Critic for a major overhaul of the Elections Act in late 1999.  The only Official Opposition amendment to the Bill, C-2, permitted by the Minister at the time, the Hon. Don Boudria, was the insertion of Clause 18.1, which permitted Elections Canada to experiment with electronic voting methods. The provision had been pushed for by White throughout the Committee hearings, but was resisted by the Minister. Agreement for the insertion of the clause was reached on the evening of 1 December 1999, during a telephone discussion between White and Boudria. The clause remains intact with a minor wording change in Bill C-23, which was introduced during the 41st Parliament to amend the Elections Act.

Electory history

References

External links 
 

Living people
1949 births
Canadian Alliance MPs
Conservative Party of Canada MPs
Members of the House of Commons of Canada from British Columbia
Reform Party of Canada MPs
21st-century Canadian politicians